This is a list of musical works written by Constant Lambert:

Ballets
 Prize-fight (1 act), 1923–4, London, FP 6 March 1924, rev. 1925, 1927, unpublished. (also version for piano, four hands)
 Mr Bear Squash-You-All-Flat (1 act; based on a Russian children's tale), 1923–4, FP Manchester, 22 June 1979, unpublished
 Adam and Eve (suite dansée), 1924–5, FP London, 6 June 1932, rev. 1932, unpublished
 Romeo and Juliet (2 tableaux), 1924–5, FP Monte Carlo, 4 May 1926 [based on Adam and Eve]
 Pomona (1 act), 1926, FP as a Divertimento 16 November 1926; FP as a ballet Buenos Aires, 9 Sept 1927 [incl. material from Adam and Eve]
 Horoscope (1 act), 1937, FP London, 27 January 1938
 Tiresias (3 scenes), 1950–51, FP London, 9 July 1951, unpublished

Incidental music
 Jew Süss (Ashley Dukes, after Lion Feuchtwanger), ?1929, score possibly lost; FP London, 19 Sept 1929; after Domenico Scarlatti (see also Arrangements: Mars and Venus)
 Salome (Oscar Wilde), clarinet, trumpet, percussion and cello, 1931, FP London, 27 May 1931
 Hamlet (William Shakespeare), flute, two trumpets and percussion, 1944, FP London, 11 Feb 1944, unpublished

Orchestral
 Green Fire, rhapsody, ? 1923, unpublished, score probably lost; FP 28 June 1923
 The Bird Actors, overture, 1925, FP 5 July 1931; reorchestrated 1927, unpublished [originally for pf 4 hands]
 Champêtre, chamber orch, 1926, unpublished in original form [used as Intrada of Pomona; arr. as Pastorale, pf]
 Elegiac Blues, 1927 [arr. pf]
 Music for Orchestra, 1927; FP 14 June 1929; dedicated to Lord Berners
 Aubade héroïque, 1942; FP 21 February 1943; dedicated to Ralph Vaughan Williams on his 70th birthday
 Caprice péruvien, orchestra (on themes by Lord Berners from Le carrosse du St Sacrement)

Concertante
 Concerto for piano, 2 trumpets, timpani and strings, 1924, unpublished
 Concerto for piano and 9 players, 1930–31; FP 18 December 1931; Arthur Benjamin, piano, conducted by the composer; dedicated to Peter Warlock
 see also Arrangements: Concerto for piano and small orchestra (an arrangement of organ concertos by George Frideric Handel)
 see also: Vocal and choral: The Rio Grande

Film scores
 Merchant Seamen, patriotic documentary 1940; orchestral suite arr. 1943, pubd, FP 15 May 1943
 Anna Karenina (dir. Julien Duvivier), 1947, unpublished

Piano
 Alla Marcia, ?1925 [incl. in Romeo and Juliet]
 Overture, pf duet, 1925, unpublished [see Orchestra: The Bird Actors]
 Suite in 3 Movements, 1925, unpublished; FP 19 March 1925
 Tema, ? 1925, unpublished.
 Pastorale, 1926, unpublished.
 Elegiac Blues, 1927
 Sonata, 1928–9; FP 30 October 1929
 Elegy, 1938
 Trois pièces nègres pour les touches blanches, 4 hands, 1949; FP 17 May 1949; dedicated to Edward Clark

Vocal and choral
 2 Songs (Sacheverell Sitwell), soprano, flute and harp, 1923; FP 6 March 1924
 8 Poems of Li-Po, voice, piano or 8 insts, 1926–9; FP 30 October 1929; dedicated to Anna May Wong
 The Rio Grande (Sacheverell Sitwell), alto, chorus, piano, brass, strings, percussion, 1927; first broadcast by the BBC 27 February 1928; first concert performance 12 December 1929, Hamilton Harty, piano
 Summer's Last Will and Testament (Thomas Nashe: Pleasant Comedy), baritone, chorus and orchestra, 1932–5; FP 29 January 1936
 Dirge from Cymbeline (William Shakespeare), tenor and baritone soli, male chorus, strings, 1940; FP 23 March 1947, BBC broadcast; dedicated to Patrick Hadley

Arrangements
 Mars and Venus (incidental music for Jew Süss) (after Domenico Scarlatti)
 Hommage aux belles viennoises, 1929 (after Franz Schubert)
 Les rendezvous, 1933 (after Daniel Auber: L'enfant prodigue)
Bar aux Folies-Bergère, 1934 ballet (arrangement of piano music by Chabrier)
 Apparitions, 1936, unpublished. (after Franz Liszt)
 Les patineurs, 1937, ballet using music of Giacomo Meyerbeer (Le prophète, L'étoile du nord)
 Harlequin in the Street, 1938, unpublished (after François Couperin)
 Dante Sonata, piano and orchestra, 1940, unpublished (after Liszt)
 The Prospect Before Us, London, 1940, unpublished (after William Boyce)
 Comus, 1942 (after Henry Purcell)
 Hamlet, London, 1942 (after Pyotr Ilyich Tchaikovsky)
 Ballabile, 1950 (after Emmanuel Chabrier)
 Caprice péruvien, orchestra (after Lord Berners: Le carrosse du St Sacrement)
 Concerto for piano and small orchestra (after George Frideric Handel: organ concertos Nos. 2 and 6)
 Facade, Suites 1 and 2 arranged for piano duet (William Walton)
 Job: A Masque for Dancing (Ralph Vaughan Williams), version for theatre orchestra; FP 1931, ISCM Festival, Oxford
 Keyboard pieces by Thomas Roseingrave

Editions
 William Boyce: 8 symphonies, string orchestra, wind ad lib
 Boyce: The Power of Music, The Cambridge Ode, Pan and Syrinx, string orchestra, wind ad lib
 Henry Purcell: The Fairy-Queen, collab. Edward J. Dent, unpublished

References

Sources
 Michael Jamieson Bristow
 mininova
 Grove's Dictionary of Music and Musicians, 5th ed., 1954, Eric Blom, ed.

Lists of compositions by composer